Nola melanogramma is a moth of the family Nolidae. It is found in Australia, including New South Wales and Tasmania.

References

melanogramma
Moths described in 1900